Heliozona is a genus of tiger moths in the family Erebidae. The genus contains two species: Heliozona lianga in Mindanao in the Philippines and Heliozona dulla in New Guinea.

Taxonomy
The genus is probably related to Satara Walker, [1865] 1864.

Species
Heliozona dulla (Pagenstecher, 1886)
Heliozona lianga (Semper, 1899)

References

Spilosomina
Moth genera
Taxa named by George Hampson